Rafael Cezar Cardoso (born 17 November 1985) is a Brazilian actor.

Career 
He began his career in television, playing small parts on specials on RBS TV in Rio Grande do Sul. His first appearance on national television was in 2008, when he played a character in the soap opera Beleza Pura.
In November 2009 Cardoso appeared in his first feature film, Do Começo ao Fim, as the character Thomas, younger half-brother of Francisco.

Filmography

Television

Film

Internet

Music Video

References

External links 

Living people
Brazilian male telenovela actors
Brazilian male film actors
Brazilian male television actors
21st-century Brazilian male actors
1985 births